Jerash Cathedral (Cathedral of St. Mary) in Jerash, Jordan, now in ruins, was built on the site of a former Roman temple.

Construction
Jerash Cathedral was raised on the ruin of the Roman temple to Dionysus, which itself was built on the site of a temple to Dushara, the Nabataean god of the royal house.  
The remains of the Roman temple were removed to the level of the podium shortly before the start of construction of the new building of the Cathedral, and its architectural elements, such as columns, were reused as material for the masonry of the church.

Named Cathedral of St. Mary, the ruins are shown in the black and white images which show the entrance to the cathedral compound and the main avenue and the forum.

Other churches in Jerash
While Jerash (or Gerasa) is best known for its extensive number of churches, many are of impressive size. Most date from the 5th and 6th centuries and are basilican in plan.

References 

Cathedrals in Jordan